Sir George Colthurst, 5th Baronet (1824-24 September 1878), was an Irish landowner and politician.

He was a Member of Parliament for Kinsale, Ireland, from 1863 to 1874 as a Liberal-Conservative. Colthurst was also grand juror and magistrate of Cork County and High Sheriff of County Cork in 1850. He was the  fifth of the Colthurst baronets, eldest son of Sir Nicholas Colthurst, 4th Baronet and Elizabeth Vesey.

Colthurst died at Buxton, Derbyshire on 24 September 1878 where he had gone to recover from gout, he was aged 54.

See also
 Blarney Castle

References

Baronets in the Baronetage of Ireland
1824 births
1878 deaths
Members of the Parliament of the United Kingdom for County Cork constituencies (1801–1922)
High Sheriffs of County Cork
UK MPs 1859–1865
UK MPs 1865–1868
UK MPs 1868–1874
George